Julien Delbecque (1 September 1903 – 22 October 1977) was a Belgian racing cyclist. He won the 1925 Tour of Flanders and the 1926 Paris–Roubaix.

References

External links

1903 births
1977 deaths
Belgian male cyclists
People from Harelbeke
Cyclists from West Flanders